John Michael Henry Hely-Hutchinson, 7th Earl of Donoughmore (12 November 1902 – 12 August 1981), known until 1948 by his courtesy title Viscount Suirdale, was a British politician who later sat as a hereditary peer in the House of Lords.

Background
Lord Donoughmore was the son of Richard Hely-Hutchinson, 6th Earl of Donoughmore. Lord Donoughmore was Member of Parliament (MP) for Peterborough from 1943–1945. In 1948 he succeeded to all his father's peerages. In the military Donoughmore gained the rank of Colonel in the service of the Royal Armoured Corps (Territorial Army). A Freemason, he was chosen Grandmaster of the Grand Lodge of Ireland in 1964, a post he held until his death.

Donoughmore is perhaps most famous for being kidnapped from Knocklofty House, Clonmel, in June 1974, with his wife, Dorothy, by the IRA as a political hostage, being released after a week.
Lord Donoughmore was succeeded by his son Richard, the 8th Earl, in 1981.

Marriage and issue 
On 27 July 1925, Lord Donoughmore married Dorothy Jean Hotham (12 August 1906 – 29 December 1995), daughter of John Beaumont Hotham and Gladys Mary Wilson. The couple had three children:
 Richard Hely-Hutchinson, 8th Earl of Donoughmore (born 8 August 1927)
 Lady Sara ('Sally') Elena Hely-Hutchinson (born 22 August 1930; died in 2013) m. William Janson Collins of the eponymous publishing house.
 Hon. Mark Hely-Hutchinson (born 19 May 1934)

See also
List of kidnappings
List of solved missing person cases

References

External links 

HostageSample.pdf

1902 births
1970s missing person cases
1981 deaths
20th-century British Army personnel
Hely-Hutchinson
Earls of Donoughmore
Formerly missing people
John
Kidnapped British people
Kidnapped Irish people
Missing person cases in Ireland
People from Clonmel
Hely-Hutchinson
UK MPs who inherited peerages
Royal Armoured Corps officers